Hesseltinella is a genus of fungi belonging to the family Cunninghamellaceae.

The genus name of Hesseltinella is in honour of Clifford William Hesseltine (1917-1999), who was an American botanist (Mycology), Microbiologist, from the University of Wisconsin.

The genus was circumscribed by Harbansh Prasad Upadhyay in Persoonia vol.6 (issue 1) on pages 111, 116-117 in 1970.

The genus has cosmopolitan distribution.

It has one known species; Hesseltinella vesiculosa H.P.Upadhyay

References

Fungi